Stepana Razina is a rural locality (a settlement) in Pokrovskoye Rural Settlement, Leninsky District, Volgograd Oblast, Russia. The population was 198 as of 2010. There are 5 streets.

Geography 
Stepana Razina is located on Caspian Depression, on the left bank of the Bulgakov, 32 km southwest of Leninsk (the district's administrative centre) by road. Gornaya Polyana is the nearest rural locality.

References 

Rural localities in Leninsky District, Volgograd Oblast